Duško Ivanović (born September 1, 1957) is a Montenegrin professional basketball coach and former player who currently serves as head coach for Crvena zvezda of the Adriatic League and the EuroLeague.

Professional playing career
As a player, Ivanović started his career with Jedinstvo Bijelo Polje. He played with Budućnost, Jugoplastika, Valvi Girona, Limoges CSP, and Fribourg Olympic. With Jugoplastika, he won two consecutive EuroLeague championships, in 1989 and 1990.

Coaching career
Ivanović's coaching career started with Sisley Fribourg, in the 1993–94 season, where he was both a player and an assistant coach, working as a player-coach. In the 1994–95 season, he was an assistant coach of Valvi Girona. After that, he was the head coach of Fribourg Olympic (1995–1999), the senior Swiss national basketball team (1997–2000), CSP Limoges (1999–2000), TAU Cerámica (2000–2005), and FC Barcelona (2005–2008), from which he resigned, on 14 February 2008.

For the 2008–09 season, he was back at Vitoria, again working as the head coach of Caja Laboral, a position he held until November 2012, when he was fired.

On June 10, 2014, Ivanović signed a two-year contract with the Greek League team Panathinaikos. On 3 May 2015, after a 66–77 home game loss to Panathinaikos' arch rivals, Olympiacos, he parted ways with the team. On March 15, 2016, Ivanović was hired as the new head coach of the Russian club Khimki. On June 29, 2017, he parted ways with Khimki. On August 20, 2018, he signed a one-year deal with Beşiktaş. In December 2019, Ivanović left Beşiktaş, to return as head coach for Kirolbet Baskonia, once again. On 15 November 2021 he left Baskonia.

On November 14, 2022, Ivanović signed a two-year contract with the Serbian team Crvena zvezda.

Coaching record

EuroLeague

|- 
| align="left" rowspan=5 |Saski Baskonia
| align="left"|2000–01
| 22 || 15 || 7 ||  || align="center"|Lost in the Finals
|- 
| align="left"|2001–02
| 15 || 11 || 4 ||  || align="center"|Eliminated in Top 16 stage
|- 
| align="left"|2002–03
| 20 || 11 || 9 ||  || align="center"|Eliminated in Top 16 stage
|- 
| align="left"|2003–04
| 20 || 13 || 7 ||  || align="center"|Eliminated in Top 16 stage
|- 
| align="left"|2004–05
| 20 || 11 || 9 ||  || align="center"|Lost in the final game
|- 
| align="left" rowspan=3|FC Barcelona
| align="left"|2005–06
| 25 || 14 || 11 ||  || align="center"|Lost in 3rd place game
|- 
| align="left"|2006–07
| 23 || 14 || 9 ||  || align="center"|Eliminated in quarterfinals
|- 
| align="left"|2007–08
| 14 || 9 || 5 ||  || align="center"|Eliminated in quarterfinals
|- 
| align="left" rowspan=5|Saski Baskonia
| align="left"|2008–09
| 21 || 14 || 7 ||  || align="center"|Eliminated in quarterfinals
|- 
| align="left"|2009–10
| 20 || 11 || 9 ||  || align="center"|Eliminated in quarterfinals
|- 
| align="left"|2010–11
| 20 || 10 || 10 ||  || align="center"|Eliminated in quarterfinals
|- 
| align="left"|2011–12
| 10 || 5 || 5 ||  || align="center"|Eliminated in regular season
|- 
| align="left"|2012–13
| 6 || 1 || 5 ||  || align="center"|Fired
|- 
| align="left"|Panathinaikos
| align="left"|2014–15
| 28 || 13 || 15 ||  || align="center"|Eliminated in quarterfinals
|- 
| align="left"|Khimki
| align="left"|2015–16
| 4 || 2 || 2 ||  || align="center"|Eliminated in Top 16 stage
|- 
| align="left" rowspan=3|Saski Baskonia
| align="left"|2019–20
| 13 || 6 || 7 ||  || align="center"| Season stopped due to the Covid-19 pandemic
|- 
| align="left"|2020–21
| 34 || 18 || 16 ||  || align="center"|Eliminated in regular season
|-
| align="left"|2021–22
| 9 || 3 || 6 ||  || align="center"|Fired
|-class="sortbottom"
| align="center" colspan=2|Career||324||181||143||||

Personal
Ivanović took part in the Montenegrin independence campaign (pro-independence side).

See also

Yugoslav First Federal Basketball League career stats leaders

References

External links
 Duško Ivanović at acb.com (player profile) 
 Duško Ivanović at fibaeurope.com (player profile)
 Duško Ivanović at euroleague.net (coach profile)
 Dusko Ivanovic, Montenegro's Holy Hand

1957 births
Living people
Basketbol Süper Ligi head coaches
BC Khimki coaches
Beşiktaş basketball coaches
Bosnia and Herzegovina basketball coaches
CB Girona players
FC Barcelona Bàsquet coaches
Fribourg Olympic players
KK Budućnost players
KK Crvena zvezda head coaches
KK Split players
Liga ACB head coaches
Limoges CSP coaches
Montenegrin basketball coaches
Montenegrin expatriate basketball people in Greece
Montenegrin expatriate basketball people in Russia
Montenegrin expatriate basketball people in Serbia
Montenegrin expatriate basketball people in Spain
Montenegrin expatriate basketball people in Switzerland
Montenegrin expatriate basketball people in Turkey
Montenegrin men's basketball players
Panathinaikos B.C. coaches
Saski Baskonia coaches
Shooting guards
Small forwards
Yugoslav men's basketball players